This is a list of Swedish television related events from 1963.

Events
16 February - Monica Zetterlund is selected to represent Sweden at the 1963 Eurovision Song Contest with her song "En gång i Stockholm". She is selected to be the sixth Swedish Eurovision entry during Melodifestivalen 1963 held in Stockholm.

Debuts

Television shows

1960s
Hylands hörna (1962-1983)

Ending this year

Births

Deaths

See also
1963 in Sweden